= Beijing Jingneng Power =

Coal power producer of China

Beijing Jingneng Power Co., Ltd. (Chinese: 北京京能电力股份有限公司, SSE: 600578) is a Beijing coal power producer and district heating supplier listed on the Shanghai Stock Exchange.

== Description ==
Beijing Jingneng Thermal Power Co., Ltd. is located in Shijingshan District of Beijing. It was founded in 2000 by the former Beijing International Power Development & Investment Corporation and former North China Electric Power Group Corporation, with 3 other shareholders, and became Beijing's first modern joint-stock power heat enterprise with a registered capital of 570 million yuan. A study of Beijing power plants reported that the Jingneng plant had a generating capacity of 800 MW and used coal as its fuel.

== Public trading ==
Following an IPO on May 10, 2002, the company was listed on the Shanghai Stock Exchange, the first Beijing thermoelectric power company to be listed. At year end 2010 the company's main shareholders were Beijing International Energy Ltd. (39.88% of shares), Shanxi International Electricity Group Co., Ltd. (26%), and Beijing Energy Investment Holding (Group) Co., Ltd. (10.68%). The company's main business includes: thermal power generation, production and sale of electrical equipment, power generation equipment maintenance, and gypsum sales. In 2010, the company total installed capacity was 186 million kilowatts, with total assets of nearly 60 billion yuan.
